Do Nothing 'til You Hear from Me is an album by jazz saxophonist Johnny Griffin which was recorded in 1963 and released on the Riverside label.

Reception

The Allmusic site awarded the album 3 stars stating "Johnny Griffin, known as the world's fastest tenor-saxophonist in the late 1950s, purposely slowed down a bit on some of his later Riverside albums including this set... The music swings and the classic tenorman cuts loose a few times, making for enjoyable if not quite essential music".

Track listing
All compositions by Johnny Griffin except as indicated
 "Do Nothing till You Hear from Me" (Duke Ellington, Bob Russell) - 5:37
 "The Midnight Sun Will Never Set" (Dorcas Cochran, Quincy Jones, Henri Salvador) - 4:59
 "That's All" (Alan Brandt, Bob Haymes) - 6:24
 "Slow Burn" - 8:14
 "Wonder Why" (Nicholas Brodzsky, Sammy Cahn) - 5:23
 "Heads Up" - 5:36

Personnel
Johnny Griffin - tenor saxophone
Buddy Montgomery - vibraphone, piano
Monk Montgomery - bass
Art Taylor - drums

References 

1963 albums
Johnny Griffin albums
Riverside Records albums
Albums produced by Orrin Keepnews